1663 van den Bos, provisional designation , is a stony Florian asteroid and an exceptionally slow rotator from the inner regions of the asteroid belt, approximately 12 kilometers in diameter. It was discovered on 4 August 1926, by English astronomer Harry Edwin Wood at Johannesburg Observatory in South Africa. It was later named after astronomer Willem Hendrik van den Bos.

Orbit and classification 

The S-type asteroid is a member of the Flora family, a large group of stony asteroids in the main-belt. It orbits the Sun at a distance of 1.8–2.6 AU once every 3 years and 4 months (1,224 days). Its orbit has an eccentricity of 0.18 and an inclination of 5° with respect to the ecliptic.

Physical characteristics

Slow rotator 

In October 2010, a rotational lightcurve of van den Bos was obtained from photometric observations by astronomers Robert Stephens and David Higgins. It gave a rotation period of 740 hours with a brightness variation of 0.80 magnitude. It is one of the slowest rotating minor planets (see list) and a suspected tumbler, that has a non-principal axis rotation. At the same time, photometric observations at the Shadowbox Observatory gave an alternative, yet ambiguous period of 155 hours with an amplitude of 0.5 magnitude.

Diameter and albedo 

According to the surveys carried out by the Japanese Akari satellite and NASA's Wide-field Infrared Survey Explorer with its subsequent NEOWISE mission, van den Bos measures between 7.58 and 13.54 kilometers in diameter, and its surface has an albedo between 0.171 and 0.255. The Collaborative Asteroid Lightcurve Link derives an albedo of 0.2045 and a diameter of 12.25 kilometers using an absolute magnitude of 11.9.

Naming 

This minor planet was named in honor of Dutch-born, South African astronomer Willem Hendrik van den Bos (1896–1974), former director of the Union Observatory (1941–1956) and president of the Astronomical Society of South Africa (1943–1955). He made visual micrometric observations and discovered thousands of double stars. The official  was published by the Minor Planet Center on 1 July 1972.

References

External links 
 Asteroid Lightcurve Database (LCDB), query form (info )
 Dictionary of Minor Planet Names, Google books
 Asteroids and comets rotation curves, CdR – Observatoire de Genève, Raoul Behrend
 Discovery Circumstances: Numbered Minor Planets (1)-(5000)  – Minor Planet Center
 
 

001663
Discoveries by Harry Edwin Wood
Named minor planets
001663
19260804